Eddy County is the name of two counties in the United States:

Eddy County, New Mexico 
Eddy County, North Dakota